Bruce Burnett (16 November 1954, Avondale, Auckland – 1 June 1985) was an AIDS activist and educator influential in establishing the New Zealand AIDS Foundation and early educational programmes.

Burnett studied architecture at the University of Auckland but did not complete his degree. After leaving university he travelled to Europe to study cuisine and returned to Auckland where he was involved in a number of cafes. In 1982 he moved to the United States, living in Berkeley and then in San Francisco. Here he trained as a volunteer for the Shanti Project, a community-based organisation that provided emotional and practical support to people living with life-threatening illnesses.

Burnett returned to New Zealand in November 1983 with swollen lymph glands and a persistent infection in his intestine. He had been diagnosed with ARC (AIDS related complex) while in the United States. On his return, he threw himself into AIDS education. The first New Zealand man who had contracted AIDS overseas and returned home died in Taranaki in February 1984. There was a vast amount of stigma surrounding the disease and as the Homosexual Law Reform bill had not yet been passed, it was hard for people to access information openly.

In 1984, with Bill Logan and Phil Parkinson, Burnett established the AIDS Support Network, and also established the AIDS hotline. Burnett travelled New Zealand in a "one-man roadshow", delivering public talks.

In a March 1985 talk given in Wellington, Burnett said:

Burnett died of an AIDS-related illness on 1 June 1985. He was active in AIDS education right up to his death and succeeded in gaining the first government funding to set up the New Zealand AIDS Foundation. Its first clinic, opened in Auckland in July 1986, is named after him. In 2022 the New Zealand AIDS Foundation rebranded, and adopted the new name "Burnett Foundation New Zealand" in honour of Burnett and others who were vital, but often not recognised, for their work for the cause.

Burnett's name is recorded on Block 12 of the New Zealand AIDS Memorial Quilt.

In June 2022, the New Zealand AIDS Foundation rebranded as the Burnett Foundation Aotearoa.

Further information

 Recorded interview with Bruce Burnett, February 1985
 HIV and Coronavirus: Remembering Bruce Burnett and Li Wenliang

References

1954 births
1985 deaths
AIDS-related deaths in New Zealand
People from Auckland
HIV/AIDS activists
HIV/AIDS in New Zealand
LGBT rights in New Zealand
New Zealand gay men